Pattie McCarthy (born 1971) is an American poet and educator.

Biography 
McCarthy completed undergraduate work at Towson University and received her MA in creative writing from Temple University in Philadelphia in 1998.

McCarthy's poetry has been noted for its use of medieval subjects, references, and imagery, in addition to "re-visioning historical texts and re-voicing what has suffered omission from sanctioned history." More recent work has focused on tensions between public and private selves and day-to-day domesticities. When interviewed, McCarthy has listed Rachel Blau DuPlessis, Susan Howe, Lyn Hejinian, Cole Swensen, and Anne Waldman as influential to her own work and style.

McCarthy teaches literature and creative writing at Temple University. She has also taught at Loyola University, Queens College of the City University of New York, and Towson University.

McCarthy lives just outside of Philadelphia with her husband, poet Kevin Varrone, and three children.

Awards and honors 
McCarthy was a Pew Fellow in the Arts in 2011. In 2013, she was an artist resident at the Elizabeth Bishop House in Nova Scotia.

Works

Books of poetry
  (Apogee Press, 2002)  OCLC 49612046
 Verso (Apogee Press, 2004)  OCLC 56663600
 Table Alphabetical of Hard Words (Apogee Press, 2010)  OCLC 759790659
 Marybones (Apogee Press, 2012)  OCLC 826737840
 Nulls (Horse Less Press, 2014)  OCLC 876350593
 Quiet Book (Apogee Press, 2016)  OCLC 953678346
Wifthing (Apogee Press, 2021) ISBN 9781733137522 OCLC 1230218946

Chapbooks
 Octaves (ixnay press, 1998) OCLC 41899445
 Choragus (Potes & Poets Press, 1998)  OCLC 41162890
 alibi (that is : elsewhere) (Duration Press, 2003)
 L&O (Little Red Leaves Press, 2011)
 Domestic Cryptography Survey II (Dusie Kollektiv, 2013)
 scenes from the lives of my parents (Bloof Books, 2013) OCLC 881183162
  (WinteRed Press, 2014)
 Nova Scotia (Dusie Kollektiv, 2014)
 fifteen genre scenes (eth press, 2014)
 worrywort [with Jenn McCreary] (Little Red Leaves Press, 2014) OCLC 925832043
 x y z && (Ahsahta Press, 2015)
 margerykempething (eth press, 2017)
qweyne wifthing (eth press, 2017)

References 

1971 births
Living people
Temple University alumni
Temple University faculty
American women poets
21st-century American poets
American women academics
21st-century American women writers